Nuriston is an urban-type settlement in Qashqadaryo Region, Uzbekistan. It is part of Nishon District. The town population in 2003 was 10,500 people.

References

Populated places in Qashqadaryo Region
Urban-type settlements in Uzbekistan